The Accademia Italiana is an international fine arts university with programs in fashion design, graphic design, interior and product design, jewelry design and photography and new media. 
It offers three-year bachelor's degree programs, professional certificates, master's degrees, short courses and study abroad programs for US university students.

History and organization
The Accademia Italiana was founded in Florence in 1984 by the architect Vincenzo Giubba and today has locations in Florence and Rome. Courses are taught in both Italian and English, according to the course of study.

Legal recognition and accreditation
The Accademia Italiana is authorized to offer bachelor's degree programs leading to degrees legally recognized by the Italian Ministry of Education (MIUR - D.M. n. 76 del 04/02/2013). The institute also offers bachelor's degrees accredited by prominent UK universities (BA Hons) and exchange programs with important universities in the US and throughout the world, as well as affiliated programs in Asia at Accademia Italiana Thailand in Bangkok.

Notes

External links
 Accademia Italiana website 
 Accademia Italiana website 

Design schools in Italy
Fashion schools
Higher education in Italy
Art schools in Italy
Universities in Italy
Educational institutions established in 1984
1984 establishments in Italy
Italian fashion